Honau is a municipality in the district of Lucerne in the canton of Lucerne in Switzerland.

History
Honau is first mentioned in 1344 as Honowa.

Geography
Of this area, 68.8% is used for agricultural purposes, while 19.2% is forested. Of the rest of the land, 9.6% is settled (buildings or roads) and the remainder (2.4%) is non-productive (rivers, glaciers or mountains). , 19.2% of the total land area was forested. Of the agricultural land, 65.6% is used for farming or pastures, while 3.2% is used for orchards or vine crops. Of the settled areas, 4% is covered with buildings,  1.6% is classed as special developments,  and 4% is transportation infrastructure. All the unproductive areas are classed as flowing water (rivers).

The municipality is located between the Reuss river and the Rooterberg mountain.

Demographics
Honau has a population of 357, of which 10.4% are foreign nationals.  Over the last 10 years the population has grown at a rate of 24.8%.  Most of the population speaks German  (94.1%), with Albanian being second most common ( 3.8%) and Portuguese being third ( 0.9%).

In the 2007 election the most popular party was the SVP which received 40.9% of the vote.  The next three most popular parties were the CVP (25.9%), the FDP (13.6%) and the Green Party (9.5%).

The age distribution in Honau is; 111 people or 31.2% of the population is 0–19 years old.  69 people or 19.4% are 20–39 years old, and 158 people or 44.4% are 40–64 years old.  The senior population distribution is 13 people or 3.7% are 65–79 years old, 5 or 1.4% are 80–89 years old and no one is over 90 years old.

The entire Swiss population is generally well educated.  In Honau about 76.4% of the population (between age 25-64) have completed either non-mandatory upper secondary education or additional higher education (either university or a Fachhochschule).

 there are 104 households, of which 19 households (or about 18.3%) contain only a single individual.  23 or about 22.1% are large households, with at least five members.   there were 84 inhabited buildings in the municipality, of which 73 were built only as housing, and 11 were mixed use buildings.  There were 61 single family homes, 8 double family homes, and 4 multi-family homes in the municipality.  Most homes were either two (35) or three (35) story structures.  There were only 2 single story buildings and 1 four or more story buildings.

Honau has an unemployment rate of 1.49%.  , there were 22 people employed in the primary economic sector and about 8 businesses involved in this sector.  2 people are employed in the secondary sector and there are 1 businesses in this sector.  67 people are employed in the tertiary sector, with 9 businesses in this sector.   52.8% of the population of the municipality were employed in some capacity.  At the same time, females made up 36.7% of the workforce.

 the religious membership of Honau was; 193 (60.3%) were Roman Catholic, and 66 (20.6%) were Protestant, with an additional 2 (0.63%) that were of some other Christian faith.   There are 17 individuals (5.31% of the population) who are Muslim.  Of the rest; there were 1 (0.31%) individuals who belong to another religion, 32 (10.%) who do not belong to any organized religion, 9 (2.81%) who did not answer the question.

The historical population is given in the following table:

References

External links

 

Municipalities of the canton of Lucerne